Marlen Spindler (1931 – 2003) was a Russian painter. He was born in the Kirgiz town of Karakol. His parents named him Marlen, by creating a portmanteau word from Marx and Lenin. He grew up all over Central Asia, in Samarkand, Tashkent and Alma-Ata. The family eventually moved to the Moscow suburb of Kraskovo.

As a painter, Spindler refused to paint in the officially endorsed genre of socialist realism. He was dismissed from his job and sentenced to 15 years in prison and exile. He continued to paint in prison under difficult circumstances. He eventually gained freedom with the fall of Soviet Communism. He had several solo exhibitions in Moscow in the 1990s, and more recently in Zurich.

References

Russian artists